Uruan is located in the south of Nigeria and is a Local Government Area of the Akwa Ibom State.

Uruan Local Government Area was created in 1988 from the Uyo Local Government Area. It covers an approximate land mass of 449 km2. Its population, according to the 2016 Census is 164,000.

The Capital City of Uruan Local Government is Idu [

The area lies in the rain forest belt with extensive arable land and the region abounds with the wildlife, raffia palm and timber. The rich coastal plains support the cultivation of crops such as cassava and maize.

Uruan people speak the Uruan language.

History 

Uruan people have maintained a good relationship with their neighbors. Their seven-clan structure is also maintained. This is the structure depicted during the coronation and burial of the Edidem Atakpor, the Nsomm of Uruan, by the presence of seven traditional bow-men, seven spear-men, seven sword-men, and seven royal staff-men each of which represent Essien Uruan.

The principal deity of Uruan people is Atakpor, which was brought from the Southern Cameroons, and believed to be a Great Mother deity that associates with water. The Atakpor was regarded as female deity and as an intermediary through which Uruan people could communicate with Abasi (God). Today Uruan people believe that this Great Mother deity lives in that body of water now known as Akwa Akpa Uruan (The Mighty Sea of Uruan).

Other aspects of Uruan heritage include Ekpe, Ekong (War), Nka (Age-grade), Ebre, Fattening Home (Nkugho), and so on. Uruan people developed the idea of Ekpe society, used for maintaining law and order, and for entertainment. There are various grades of Ekpe, such as Nyamkpe, Nkanda, Mbökkö and Ibom. The Ekpe members of higher grades are known for their display of Nsibidi, a secret writing or signs used for communication among the members. The Ekong is a traditional warrior society used for encouraging chivalry or bravery among men in Uruan. It was developed as an instrument for checking social ills, and fostering security and unity among the people. The Ebre was a traditional society used by women for social and political control, and for promotion of women rights. Nka (Age-grades) in Uruan were used for effective performance of different aspects of community work, mutual help and for discipline of their members.

Uruan people developed Uruan language which they derived from the proto-language. It is a variant of Ibibio language. Uruan language is what has for historical reasons been referred to as Efik language, and Uruan and Efik are all Iboku people.

According to Uruan historians, like Dominus Essien of University of Uyo and Edet Akpan Udo of “Who Are the Ibibios”, Uruan people are believed to have migrated in different waves from East-Central and Southern Africa to Uruan Akpe in the area now called Idomi in the Rio del Rey near the Southwest Region of Cameroon and Cross River State border where they settled for centuries. Due to the first Batanga war which caused economic and social disorder in the region, Uruan people migrated to area in the Cross River Basin called Akani Obio Uruan in about 8th century A.D. The river near the settlement was named Akwa Akpa Uruan meaning (Mighty River of Uruan).

It is believed that in the 13th century, hundreds of Uruan people, another Iboku group who also migrated through a different route joined their kindred at Akani Obio Uruan and Akpa Mfri Ukim. Due to geographical and ecological problems, such as frequent floods, Uruan people migrated again further to the mainland and occupied an area now known as Uruan Local Government Area in Akwa Ibom State.

Due to social conflicts between some clans within Uruan, Akpe Iboku people of Uruan, now Eburutu tribe, later nicknamed “Efik” migrated from Uruan Country (Essien Uruan Itiaba) to such places as [[Creek Town (Uruan Esit Edik), Duke Town (Uruan Ibuot Utan), Henshaw Town (Nsidung). Until today, some Efik families still treasure their connections with some Uruan villages, such as Esuk Odu, Issiet Ekim, Mbiaya, Ibiaku Uruan, Adadia, Ndon Ebom, and Ekpene Ibia, most of which still speak Efik language.

Clans 
Of original twelve traditional clans, only seven largely unrecognized clans remain today. Others are believed to have settled among the Ibibios such as Ekpene Ukim village in Nsit Ubium and Ikpa village in Eket. To date, these villages still maintain strong bond with their Uruan kindreds.

The remaining seven clans are:
 Akwa Uruan, comprising Nturukpum, Esuk Odu, Ibuno Issiet, Issiet Inua Akpa, Use Uruan, Issiet Ekim, Ekim-Enen, Afaha Ikot, Ikot Nkanga, Ama Odung, Ikot Owot, Esuk Issiet and Obio Nkan.
 Etongko Mkpe Uruan, comprising Ifiayong Obot, Obio Obot Osong, Osong, Akpa Utong, Ibikpe, Ikot Udo, and Mbiaya.
 Mutaka Uruan, comprising Ekpene Ibia, Ikot Edung, Ibiaku Issiet, Obio Ndobo, Ikot Akpa Ekang, Ikot Akan and Adadia.
 Ekondo Uruan, comprising Ibiaku Ikot Ese, Ndon Uruan, Ituk Mbang, Ekpene Ukim, Ndon Ebom, Esuk Inyang, Nung Ikono Ufok, and Nung Ikono Obio.
 Mosongko Uruan, comprising Akpa Mfri Ukim, Esuk Anakpa, Ufak Obio Uruan, Akani Obio Uruan, Obio Akwa Akpa Uruan, Esuk Idu, Ikot Etuong, Ifiayong Esuk, Nwaniba, Mbiakong, Ifiayong Usuk, Eman Ikot Udo and Idu.
 Ibonda Uruan, comprising Edik Ikpa, Eman Ukpa, Anakpa, Nna Enin, Ikot Inyang Esuk, Nung Oku and Ikot Oto Inyie.
 Akpe Iboku Uruan, comprising Ibiaku, Eman, Utit, Ita, Ikpa, Ikot Oku and Esuk Ikpa.

See also
(Idu uruan)
Adadia
Ibiaku Uruan
Utit Uruan]* {Ikot Akan}

References 

Local Government Areas in Akwa Ibom State